The 1913 Copa de Competencia Jockey Club was the final that decided the champion of the 7th. edition of this National cup of Argentina. In the match, held in Racing Club Stadium in Avellaneda on 12 October, 1913, San Isidro defeated Racing 2–0, winning their third consecutive title.

Racing Club would take revenge two months later when they won the 1913 Argentine Primera División Final v San Isidro so both teams had finished the championship equaled on points.

Qualified teams

Overview 
The 1913 edition had a preliminary phase contested by 32 clubs, 28 within Buenos Aires Province and 4 from Santa Fe Province. Racing Club thrashed Unión de Santa Fe 8–0, qualifying to the first stage (contested by 12 clubs). There, Racing beat Belgrano AC 1–0, Estudiantes BA 1–0, and Estudiantil Porteño in the semifinals at Ferro Carril Oeste (3–1).
|
On the other hand, San Isidro beat Newell's Old Boys in preliminary round (4–2),  then eliminating Boca Juniors (2–1), and Banfield 4–1 in semifinals.

Match details

References 

j
J
1913 in Argentine football
Football in Avellaneda